Khulm or Khulmi (see Kholm, Afghanistan) is a district of Balkh province, Afghanistan. Its capital lies at Kholm. In 2019 the estimated population was 81,234.

District profile:
 Villages: 91
 Education: 7 primary, 13 secondary, 7 high schools
 Health centers: 2 basic, 2 comprehensive

References

External links
 Summary of District Development Plan July 2009

Districts of Balkh Province